is a prefecture of Japan located on the island of Shikoku. Kagawa Prefecture borders Ehime Prefecture to the southwest and Tokushima Prefecture to the south.

Takamatsu is the capital and largest city of Kagawa Prefecture, with other major cities including Marugame, Mitoyo, and Kan'onji. Kagawa Prefecture is located on the Seto Inland Sea across from Okayama Prefecture on the island of Honshu, which is connected by the Great Seto Bridge. Kagawa Prefecture includes Shōdoshima, the second-largest island in the Seto Inland Sea, and the prefecture's southern land border with Tokushima Prefecture is formed by the Sanuki Mountains.

History 

Kagawa was formerly known as Sanuki Province.

For a brief period between August 1876 and December 1888, Kagawa was made a part of Ehime Prefecture.

Battle of Yashima
Located in Kagawa's capital city, Takamatsu, the mountain of Yashima was the battlefield for one of the best-known struggles between the Heike and Genji clans.

Geography 
Kagawa comprises the northeast corner of Shikoku, bordering Ehime Prefecture on the west and Tokushima Prefecture on the south, with a coastline on the Seto Inland Sea facing Okayama Prefecture and the Kansai. The Sanuki Mountains run along the southern border.

Kagawa is currently the smallest prefecture, by area, in Japan. Kagawa is a relatively narrow prefecture located between the mountains of Shikoku and the sea.

As of April 1, 2012, 11% of the total land area of the prefecture was designated as Natural Parks, namely Setonaikai National Park and Ōtaki-Ōkawa Prefectural Natural Park.

Cities

Eight cities are located in Kagawa Prefecture:

Towns 
Kagawa has eight towns organized into five districts. Many were created after 1999 through mergers, as part of a national effort to reduce the number of small towns and villages.

Mergers

Economy 

Kagawa has a nominal GDP of approximately 3,802 billion yen. Kagawa's major export industries, in order of export value, include transportation equipment, electrical equipment, chemical products, general machinery, mineral fuels, manufactured goods, raw materials, and foodstuff.

Foods 

Sanuki udon (a type of udon noodle) is the most famous local food of Kagawa Prefecture. In 2008, there were over 700 udon restaurants in this prefecture alone.

Aside from udon, Kagawa is also famous for "hone-tsuki-dori", seasoned chicken thigh cooked on the bone. Originating from Marugame City, the dish has now become a popular dish in izakaya restaurants across the country.

Olives and olive-related products have also come to be recognized as Kagawa foods. As the first place in Japan to successfully cultivate olives, Kagawa has been producing olive-related products since 1908. As well as winning both domestic and international awards for the quality of its olive oil, Kagawa has also created two offshoot food brands from its olive industry - "olive beef" and "olive yellowtail". Waste organic matter from olive pressing is used as feed for cattle and the Yellowtail Amberjack. Due to the high amount of polyphenols in the olive waste, the flesh of the respective meats does not oxidize or lose color easily.

Other local specialties include wasanbon sugar sweets, sōmen noodles and shōyu soy sauce.
Rare sugar researches are thriving and have discovered mass production culture enzymes. D-tagatose 3-epimerase is an enzyme that catalyzes the reversible epimerization reaction of the 3rd carbon of ketose.

Demographics 

As of October 2020, Kagawa Prefecture had an estimated population of 950,244. This was .54% lower than the population in the 2000 census, being 1,022,890. The area of the prefecture is 1,877 km, and the population density is 506.3/km.

Education

Universities 
Kagawa University in Takamatsu
Kagawa Prefectural College of Health Sciences
Shikoku Gakuin University in Zentsuji
Takamatsu University
Tokushima Bunri University in Sanuki

Sports 

The sports teams listed below are based in Kagawa.

Baseball
Kagawa Olive Guyners

Basketball
Kagawa Five Arrows  (Takamatsu)

Football (Soccer)
Kamatamare Sanuki  (Takamatsu)
Volleyball
Shikoku Eighty 8 Queen

Ice Hockey
 Kagawa Ice Fellows (see Japan Ice Hockey Federation)

Tourism 

 Kotohira
 Kanamaruza Kabuki Theatre
 Konpira Shrine
 Manno
 Manno Lake
 Sanuki Manno National Park
 Marugame
 Marugame Castle
 Marugame Genichiro-Inokuma Museum of Contemporary Art
Sakaide
Kagawa Prefectural Higashiyama Kaii Setouchi Art Museum (Kaii Higashiyama`s Art Museum)
Mountain Iino (Kagawa's Mount Fuji)
Kiyama (a castle ruins)
 Shinto shrine (misasagi) (Emperor Sutoku's Tomb)
Fuchu Dam
Great Seto Bridge
 Higashi Kagawa
 Hiketa Castle - A castle ruin, one of the Continued 100 Fine Castles of Japan in 2017.
 Naoshima Island
 Ando Museum
 Benesse House
 Chichu Art Museum
 Lee Ufan Museum
 Setonaikai National Park
 Shikoku Pilgrimage – Zentsū-ji, Motoyama-ji, Yashima-ji, etc.

 Shodoshima
 Kankakei Gorge
 Shodoshima Olive Park
 Takamatsu
 Megijima and Ogijima
 Ritsurin Garden
 Takamatsu Castle
 Yashima, the island on which the Battle of Yashima was fought
Teshima Island
Shima Kitchen
Teshima Art Museum
Zentsūji
Amagiri Castle

Based on its ancient name, Sanuki, Kagawa is famous for its Sanuki udon (wheat noodles). Recent years have seen an  interest in Sanuki udon across Japan, and many Japanese now take day-trips to taste the many Sanuki udon restaurants in Kagawa.

Transportation

Railroad 
JR Shikoku
Seto-Ōhashi Line
Yosan Line
Dosan Line
Kotoku Line
Kotoden (Takamatsu Kotohira Electric Railroad)
Kotohira Line
Shido Line
Nagao Line

Bus

Departure from Takamatsu 
Tokyo Station
Shinjuku of Tokyo
Tokyo Disneyland
Hachioji
Yokohama
Nagoya
Kyoto Station
Osaka
Umeda
Nanba
Kansai Int'l Airport
Kobe
Sannomiya
Maiko Bus Stop
Tokushima
Kōchi
Matsuyama
Yawatahama
Hiroshima
Fukuoka
Kokura Station
Hakata Station
Tenjin Station

Road

Expressway 
Seto-Chūō Expressway
Takamatsu Expressway
Matsuyama Expressway

National Highway 
 Route 11 (Tokushima-Takamatsu-Marugame-Niihama-Maysuyama)
 Route 30
 Route 32 (Takamatsu-Kotohira-Kochi)
 Route 193
 Route 318
 Route 319
 Route 377
 Route 436
 Route 438

Port 
Port of Takamatsu – Ferry route to Uno, Tonoshō (Shōdoshima Island), Kobe, Naoshima
Port of Marugame
Port of Tadotsu
Port of Tonoshō – Ferry route to Okayama, Himeji, Kobe and Osaka.

Airport 
Takamatsu Airport

In popular culture 
 Shōdoshima is the setting of the novel Twenty-Four Eyes by Sakae Tsuboi and its subsequent film adaptations.
 In Pom Poko, the tanuki Tamasaburo Onigamori travels to Shikoku to ask the Transformation Masters to come to Tokyo to save Tama Hills from destruction, but he marries and settles there for three years.
 The manga Teasing Master Takagi-san is also set on Shōdoshima, in Tonoshō the native place of the creator, Sōichirō Yamamoto
 The novel Battle Royale by Koushun Takami was set in the fictional town of Shiroiwa ('Castle Rock') in Kagawa Prefecture. Okishima, the fictional island on which much of the novel takes place is placed in the Seto Inland Sea. The manga also places Shiroiwa in Kagawa, while the film moves Shiroiwa to Kanagawa Prefecture.
 The city of Takamatsu is the main setting of the book "Kafka on the Shore" by Haruki Murakami.
 Kan'onji is the setting of the early parts of the manga My Bride Is a Mermaid as well as the anime series Yuki Yuna is a Hero.
 Poco's Udon World.

Notes

References

External links

  Official Kagawa Prefecture Japanese homepage
 National Archives of Japan  ... Kagawa map (1891)
 Notes from Shikoku in English

 
Shikoku region
Prefectures of Japan